Jessiman is a surname. Notable people with the surname include:

Duncan Jessiman (1923–2006), Canadian lawyer
George Jessiman (1900–1986), Scottish footballer
Hugh Jessiman (born 1984), American ice hockey player
James Jessiman, Scottish footballer
Jim Jessiman (1912–1989), Canadian politician
Ryan Jessiman (born 1983) London tattoo artist